Patrizia  is a feminine Italian given name meaning "noble". Notable people with the name include:

 Patrizia (singer), Italian-Canadian dramatic coloratura soprano who performs operatic rock
 Patrizia von Brandenstein (born 1943), American production designer
 Patrizia Ciofi (born 1967), Italian operatic soprano
 Patrizia Gianni (born 1952), Italian mathematician
 Patrizia Laquidara (born 1972), Italian singer
 Patrizia Panico (born 1975), Italian football player 
 Patrizia Paterlini-Bréchot, Italian scientist 
 Patrizia Reggiani (born 1948), ex-wife of Maurizio Gucci
 Patrizia Scianca (born 1961), Italian voice actress 
 Patrizia Toia (born 1950), Italian politician

See also
 
 
 Patrizia Immobilien
 Patrizia AG

References

Italian feminine given names